Joseph Drapell  (born March 13, 1940) is a Czech-Canadian abstract painter.

Early life
Drapell was born in Humpolec, Czechoslovakia, and emigrated to Canada in 1966. From 1968-1970 he studied at the Cranbrook Academy of Art in Bloomfield Hills, Michigan. At the Cranbrook Academy he met visiting Canadian artist Jack Bush and the American art critic Clement Greenberg. Bush influenced his work by telling him to pay more attention to intuition. He moved permanently to Toronto in 1970 and during the period from 1972 through 1974, in Toronto, he developed a technique of applying paint with a broad spreading device attached to a movable support having also been influenced by the American painter Morris Louis.

Career
Drapell began his formal career as an artist when he was 28 and has participated in numerous exhibitions. In 1968 Drapell designed and built a public sculpture titled Life in Halifax.

He is a Canadian/Czech artist from two generations after the Painters Eleven but does not see any connection to that group as well as a founding member of the New New Painters, a group that has exhibited together internationally since the 1990s. The core of this group is from the United States: it has two Canadian members: Drapell and Graham Peacock from Edmonton. Drapell and his wife, the poet Anna Maclachlan, founded the first Museum of New New Painting in 1998 devoted to exhibiting New New art. One writer calls it everything meretriculous and impure, but admits Drapell can produce impressive effects, often based on a Georgian Bay retreat bought in 1971.

Drapell is also a member of the Royal Canadian Academy of Arts.

References

External links
 official website.

Bibliography 

1940 births
Living people
People from Humpolec
Czechoslovak emigrants to Canada
20th-century Canadian painters
Canadian male painters
Czech male painters
Members of the Royal Canadian Academy of Arts
21st-century Canadian painters
20th-century Canadian male artists
21st-century Canadian male artists
Canadian abstract artists